Wade Through the Boggs is a compilation released by Sebadoh in 2007 and sold during its tour that year. It was limited to 1000 copies.

The tracks are live recordings, radio performances, alternate versions and unreleased songs.

The title refers to former Boston Red Sox player Wade Boggs.

Track listing 
"Happily Divided" (Loewenstein) [2:21] Radio, Holland, May 1993
"Healthy Sick" (Barlow) [1:22] Radio, Holland, May 1993, Eric-Piano, Lou-Percussion
"Messin' Around" (Gaffney) [1:35] Recorded May 1992
"Cheapshot" (Barlow) [1:29] Live at ? year ?
"Let the Day Have Its Way"  (Loewenstein) [2:18]
"Mean Distance" (Gaffney) [2:56] Oak Street Garage 1990
"Spoiled" (Barlow) [3:03] 1991
"Not My Friend"  (Loewenstein) [1:31] Recorded 1989
"MEE-YOW" (Barlow) [1:14]
"Smaller Yard" (Barlow) [2:19]
"All That I Could" (Barlow) [1:39]
"Broken Love" (Barlow) [3:29]
"Cry Sis" (Gaffney) [2:34] Recorded 1990-1992
"Limb By Limb" (Gaffney) [2:09] Recorded 1990, with Lou-Bass/Vocals
"Indeed You Are" (Loewenstein) [2:27]
"Wake and Bake" (Gaffney) [2:14] Recorded 1992, Eric Gaffney-Drums, Left Guitar, Jason Loewenstein-Bass, guitar
"Visibly Wasted (reprise)" (Gaffney) [1:33] Recorded Don't Come on Monday, Berlin, November 1992
"Wade Through the Boggs" [5:27] Recorded 1992, Eric Gaffney-Drums, Left Guitar, Jason Loewenstein-Bass, guitar
"Katina's Live 1990" (Barlow/Gaffney/Loewenstein) Hadley, MA., January 1990
"Chicken Walk" (traditional) [2:25] Lou-Bass/Vocal, Eric-Guitar, Jason-Drums
"Sebadough!" (Barlow) [0.59]

External links

2007 albums
Sebadoh albums